The Home Department (Malayalam: ആഭ്യന്തര വകുപ്പ്) is a department of the Government of Kerala. It plays a key role in maintenance of law and order in the state of Kerala. The department oversees the maintenance of law and order, prevention and control of crime, prosecution of criminals besides dealing with fire services and prisons administration. 

The department is also responsible for the functioning of State Police, Prisons and Correctional Services, Fire and Rescue Services, Civil Defence and Home Guards. The department is also the cadre controlling authority of Indian Police Service (IPS) (Kerala Cadre) and Kerala Police Service (KPS). The Chief Minister generally serves as the departmental minister, and the Additional Chief Secretary (Home & Vigilance), an IAS officer, is the administrative head of the department. Pinarayi Vijayan is the current Home Minister of Kerala.

Line Departments 
Activities of Kerala Police headed by State Police Chief, Kerala Fire and Rescue Services headed by the Director General, Fire and Rescue Services, Homeguards and Civil Defence, Kerala Prisons & Correctional Services headed by the Director General of Prisons and the Chemical Examiners Laboratory headed by the Chief Chemical Examiner and Prosecution Directorate is headed by the Director General of Prosecution are under the administrative Control of the Home Department. All these departments are inter-linked and co-ordinated by the Home department.

References

Government departments of Kerala
Government of Kerala